The Cayman Islands competed at the 1988 Summer Olympics in Seoul, South Korea. Eight competitors, seven men and one woman, took part in seven events in two sports.

Competitors
The following is the list of number of competitors in the Games.

Athletics

Men's Javelin Throw 
 Paul Hurlston
 Qualification — 62.34m (→ did not advance)

Women's Marathon
 Michelle Bush — 2:51:30 (→ 52nd place)

Cycling

Six cyclists, all men, represented the Cayman Islands in 1988.

Men's road race
 Perry Merren
 Richard Pascal
 Michele Smith

Men's team time trial
 Nick Baker
 Alfred Ebanks
 Craig Merren
 Richard Pascal

Men's sprint
 Michele Smith

Men's 1 km time trial
 Michele Smith

Men's points race
 Michele Smith

See also
Cayman Islands at the 1987 Pan American Games

References

External links
Official Olympic Reports

Nations at the 1988 Summer Olympics
1988
Olympics